"Thank You (Falettinme Be Mice Elf Agin)" is a 1969 song recorded by Sly and the Family Stone. The song, released as a double A-side single with "Everybody Is a Star", reached number one on the soul single charts for five weeks, and reached number one on the Billboard Hot 100 in February 1970. Billboard ranked the record as the No. 19 song of 1970.

The title is an intentional mondegreen or sensational spelling for "thank you for letting me be myself again." The third verse contains specific references to the group's previous successful songs, "Dance to the Music", "Everyday People", "Sing a Simple Song", and "You Can Make It If You Try". The song features co-lead vocals from Sly Stone, Rose Stone, Freddie Stone, Cynthia Robinson, Jerry Martini, Greg Errico and Larry Graham. On this song, Graham was widely credited with introducing the slap technique on the electric bass, which is heard prominently throughout the track.

"Thank You" was intended to be included on an in-progress album with "Star" and "Hot Fun in the Summertime"; but the LP was never completed, and the three tracks were instead included on the band's 1970 Greatest Hits LP. "Thank You" and "Star", the final Family Stone recordings issued in the 1960s, marked the beginning of a 20-month gap of releases from the band, which would finally end with the release of "Family Affair" in 1971.

The song's length on the original hit single and the Greatest Hits LP is 4:48 and was re-channeled to simulate stereo on the popular Greatest Hits LP. The previously unreleased full-length version (6:18) was mixed by Bob Irwin in true stereo and its only issue was on a 1990 Columbia promotional CD Legacy: Music for the Next Generation. On the subsequent (and available as of 2015) The Essential Sly & The Family Stone 2-CD set, the track is in stereo but is the standard 4:48 length hit version.

The song was ranked number 410 on Rolling Stone magazine's "500 Greatest Songs of All Time". Janet Jackson's 1989 signature song "Rhythm Nation" is based on a guitar sample from the song.

The song was followed by a re-working on the closing track, "Thank You for Talkin' to Me, Africa", from the group's subsequent 1971 album, There's A Riot Goin' On.

Personnel
 Sly Stone – co-lead vocals, guitar, writer, producer
 Rose Stone – co-lead vocals
 Jerry Martini – tenor saxophone and co-lead vocals
 Cynthia Robinson – trumpet and co-lead vocals
 Freddie Stone – guitar, co-lead vocals
 Larry Graham – bass, co-lead vocals
 Greg Errico – drums and co-lead vocals

See also
List of Billboard Hot 100 number-one singles of 1970
List of number-one R&B singles of 1970 (U.S.)

References

1969 singles
1970 singles
Billboard Hot 100 number-one singles
Cashbox number-one singles
Funk songs
Sly and the Family Stone songs
Song recordings produced by Sly Stone
Songs written by Sly Stone
1969 songs
Epic Records singles